Tatyana Koshevnikova (born ) is a Kazakhstani weightlifter, competing in the 63 kg category and representing Kazakhstan at international competitions. She competed at world championships, most recently at the 2001 World Weightlifting Championships.

Major results

References

External links
 World Championships, Athens 22 November FINAL RESULTS 58kg WOMEN TOTAL
 Koshevnikova Tatyana

1980 births
Living people
Kazakhstani female weightlifters
Place of birth missing (living people)
20th-century Kazakhstani women
21st-century Kazakhstani women